Larry Eugene Hendricks III (born April 8, 1991) is an American rapper from San Francisco, California. He is known for his EPs Larry and Orange Season and has toured with musicians such as Cousin Stizz, Berner, Curren$y, and Post Malone. June has released 19 underground projects, and is currently an independent artist, having previously being signed to Warner Records.

Early life
Larry Eugene Hendricks III is originally from San Francisco's Bayview Hunters Point neighborhood. He was born to teenage parents. At age four, he moved to Atlanta, Georgia, where he stayed until the age of 16, though he would return to visit family in San Francisco every summer. After middle school, June attended high school at Jesse Bethel High School in Vallejo, California. His father dabbled in rap, which influenced June. He would distribute CD's with his music to schools in his area, and found a breakthrough after selling his music to Rasputin Music store in Berkeley. June later dropped out of high school to focus on making music.

Career
Hendricks started off on services as a teenager like MySpace networking with artists like G-Eazy back in 2006 and on Youtube using it to find instrumentals from producers like Cardo in 2008, both musicians went to become collaborators of his years later. Larry released his first body of work in 2010 entitled "Cali Grown".

In 2014, Complex posted June's mixtape Route 80 with TM88. Following the exposure in Complex, he was signed to Warner Records, with the label giving him a $20,000 advance in exchange for two extended plays with the option for more records. According to June, Warner failed to show interest in his work, which led him to stop recording music for two years. He instead toured the US, opening for Post Malone and Smokepurpp. June released numerous tracks in 2016, including the full-length mixtape Sock It to Me. Warner eventually released him, and he created an account with DistroKid, releasing the projects You're Doing Good, Sock it to Me, Pt. 2 and Very Peaceful. As an independent artist, he made more profit from his music streams. He also released the EPs Larry and Orange Season, both of which were produced by Cookin' Soul. The release of Orange Season was accompanied by an iOS game of the same name, inspired by Nintendo's early era 8-bit graphics. He also toured with Cousin Stizz in 2016 and was featured on Stizz's song Down Like That as well as Malone's single Never Understand. Additional collaborations in 2016 include rapping with Asher Roth and Michael Christmas on the track "Laundry".

In 2020, during the COVID-19 pandemic, he recorded at his home studio, releasing six projects, including Adjust to the Game, Cruise USA, Numbers, and Keep Going. In early 2021, June launched the Honeybear Boba in San Francisco.

On June 11, 2021, June released Orange Print, a project that "displays every bit of his persona". The release marked his first to be distributed through Empire Distribution, after he stopped releasing independently thought DistroKid. Speaking to The Ringer in May 2021, June said he would consider a major-label record deal if the opportunity comes, but is not rushed about it.

Artistry
Logan Murdock of The Ringer wrote about June's craft: "If E-40 is rap's model of independence, June is hip-hop's Jack LaLanne, and he's primed to transform Bay Area rap. He has a mouthpiece like Mac Dre and the soul of RBL Posse, with a mission to make it on his terms, even if celebrity doesn't necessarily follow. June is known to rap about "passive income", and has said he does not consider his music to portray him as a "lifetime coach", but instead wants to help those from the streets who are trying to make a healthy income. Among his most used ad-libs are "Yee-hee", inspired by Michael Jackson, and "Good job, Larry", stemming from his ascent in the industry.”

Orange branding
Outside his career as a musician, June plans on releasing his own brand of oranges based on a suggestion from a friend whose family owns a farm. On his social media promotions, June ends his sentences with an orange emoji.

Discography

Studio albums

Collaborative albums

Extended plays

Mixtapes

Singles

As lead artist

As featured artist

Guest appearances

References

External links

 

American rappers
Warner Records artists
Rappers from the San Francisco Bay Area
People from Riverdale, Georgia
1991 births
Living people
Musicians from Vallejo, California
21st-century American rappers
Bayview–Hunters Point, San Francisco